A plate nut, also known as a nut plate, anchor nut or anchor plate, is a stamped sheet metal nut that is usually riveted to a workpiece. They have a long tube that is internally threaded and a plate with two clearance holes for rivets. The most popular versions have two lugs and they exist as fixed anchor nuts and as floating anchor nuts. The latter allows the nut to move slightly and so enlarges the positioning tolerances of the mounted parts. They were originally developed for the aerospace industry, but are now also common in automotive racing.
These nuts are made up of variety of soft and hard materials. The choice of material depends on environment to which nut is subjected. Soft materials like copper or brass are used when nut is used in electrical application. Hard materials are used when nut is subjected to high stress environment. Sometimes stainless steel or nickel-plated nuts are used in order to increase corrosion resistance.

Locknut types are available, which utilize deformed threads or a nylon locking element, much like a nyloc nut.  These locking plate nuts are used when the nut is subjected to constant changes in environment or to vibration.  The nylon insert expands and stops vibrations of the nut and acts as a locking arrangement.  Other types have a floating nut or replaceable locking elements. A typical U.S. military specification for plate nuts is MS21047.

See also
Speed nut
Swage nut
Rivet nut

References

Notes

Bibliography
.

Nuts (hardware)